Beatrice Geraldine Hill-Lowe (26 January 1869 – 2 July 1951) was an Irish archer who represented Britain. She was born in County Louth, Ireland. She was the first Irishwomen to win an Olympic medal. She won a bronze medal at the 1908 Summer Olympics in London.

Career 
Beatrice Hill Lowe is most recognised for her success in the 1908 Olympic games. Having grown up in the privileged house hold of Ardee House County Louth, Beatrice was exposed to the luxury of playing sport. It is unknown how Beatrice began playing sport however, she definitely had access to the funds to support her interest.

In 1908 Archery was the only sport available to women, in which they could take part in the Olympic games. The reason archery was available to women is solely due to the fact it involved no running, enabling women to be fully clothed while partaking (Naughton, 2019). It was a sport which involved costly equipment and access to private land in which would enable them to practise on. In 1908 Olympics Ireland was still under British rule, meaning there was no Irish team to exist, and any athletes wishing to partake were obliged to compete under the Union Jack flag. Hill-Lowe continued on to partake in the London 1908 Olympic games in which she excelled at the age of forty.

Hill-Lowe was the first Irish woman to win an Olympic medal. Hill-Lowe competed in the Double national round, which entailed of 25 competitors, all being British or Irish. The double national round was one of three archery events taking place. In this event each round contained 48 arrows shot at 60 yards, and 24 arrows shot at 50 yards (Olympian., 2019). Both rounds were held on Friday 17 and Saturday 18 July 1908, where a total of 144 arrows were shot over 2 rounds. On the first day Lottie Dodd was in the lead with a total of 348 points and 66 hits, and Queenie Newall with a score of 338 points. The second day Queenie Newall scored a total of 350 points and Lottie Dodd with 294. Beatrice-Hill Lowe fell into third place with a total score of 618 points (DOD et al., 2019 leaving her 70 points short of the winner Queenie Newall, whom was 54 years old at the time. (Olympian., 2019) After her Olympic career Beatrice Hill-Lowe continued on to a quiet life, where she moved to Shropshire in England. Just three years after her Olympic success her husband died, however she soon after returned to Ireland where she remarried again.

Hill-Lowe competed at the 1908 Games in the only archery event open to women, the double National round.  She took third place in the event with her 618 points, 70 behind champion Queenie Newall's tally.

The County Museum Dundalk featured Hill-Lowe in an exhibition in 2012.

References

Sources
 
 
 Beatrice Hill-Lowe's profile at Sports Reference.com

1868 births
1951 deaths
Sportspeople from County Louth
British female archers
Archers at the 1908 Summer Olympics
Olympic archers of Great Britain
Olympic bronze medallists for Great Britain
Irish female archers
Olympic medalists in archery
Medalists at the 1908 Summer Olympics